Gildeskål is a municipality in Nordland county, Norway. It is part of the Bodø Region and the traditional district of Salten. The administrative centre of the municipality is the village of Inndyr. Other villages include Forstranda, Lekanger, Mevik, Mårnes, Nygårdsjøen, Saura, Storvika, Sør-Arnøy, Sørfinnset, and Våg.

The  municipality is the 170th largest by area out of the 356 municipalities in Norway. Gildeskål is the 285th most populous municipality in Norway with a population of 1,894.

General information

The municipality of Gildeskaal (later spelled Gildeskål) was established as a municipality on 1 January 1838 (see formannskapsdistrikt law). In 1853, the eastern (inland) district of Gildeskaal (population: about 1,150) was separated to become the new municipality of Beiarn. This left Gildeskaal with about 2,400 residents. The municipal boundaries have not changed since.

Name
The municipality (originally the parish) is named after the old Gildeskaal farm since the first Gildeskål Church was built there.

Coat of arms
The coat of arms was granted on 12 February 1988. The official blazon is "Azure, a chalice argent". This means the arms have a blue field (background) and the charge is a chalice. The chalice has a tincture of argent which means it is commonly colored white, but if it is made out of metal, then silver is used. The arms are canting since the meaning of the municipal name Gildeskål refers to a banquet hall (or guildhall) which, of course, is a place where one might drink from a chalice. The arms were designed by Arvid Sveen.

Churches
The Church of Norway has one parish within the municipality of Gildeskål. It is part of the Bodø domprosti (arch-deanery) in the Diocese of Sør-Hålogaland.

Geography
Gildeskål is a coastal municipality that encompasses part of the mainland as well as many islands. Major islands include Fleina, Fugløya, Nordarnøya, Sørarnøya, and Sandhornøya. The southern part of the municipality includes part of the Saltfjellet mountains and the northern part of the municipality borders the Saltfjorden and the Vestfjorden.

There are many lakes in the municipality including: Fellvatnet, Langvatnet, Litle Sokumvatnet, and Sokumvatnet.

Government
All municipalities in Norway, including Gildeskål, are responsible for primary education (through 10th grade), outpatient health services, senior citizen services, unemployment and other social services, zoning, economic development, and municipal roads. The municipality is governed by a municipal council of elected representatives, which in turn elect a mayor.  The municipality falls under the Salten District Court and the Hålogaland Court of Appeal.

Municipal council
The municipal council of Gildeskål is made up of 17 representatives that are elected to four year terms. The party breakdown of the council is as follows:

Mayors
The mayors of Gildeskål:

 1838–1847: Stein Eilert Berner
 1848–1849: Ole Helgesen
 1850–1851: Peder H. Berg 
 1852–1860: Edvard Pedersen 
 1860–1862: Hans Henrik Holck Daae
 1863–1866: Jørgen Blix
 1867–1868: Hans Henrik Holck Daae
 1869–1870: Hans Olsen
 1871–1872: Eilert Nicolai Friis 
 1873–1876: Hans Hansen 
 1877–1878: Abel Ellingsen 
 1879–1882: Hans Hansen 
 1883–1884: Christoffer Arntzen 
 1885–1888: Hans Hansen 
 1889–1894: Håkon Hansen 
 1895–1910: O. Laugsand
 1911–1913: Paulius Danielsen 
 1914–1919: Jens Johansen 
 1920–1922: Daniel Johan Eilertsen 
 1923–1925: Johan Nilsen-Nygaard 
 1926-1926: Daniel Johan Eilertsen 
 1927–1928: Øyvind Heen 
 1929–1940: Peder Johnsen 
 1941-1941: Øyvind Heen 
 1941–1945: Lars Norum 
 1945-1945: Peder Johnsen 
 1946–1947: Astrup Johansen
 1948–1958: Reidar Juliussen Myrhaug 
 1958–1961: Magnus Sundsfjord
 1962–1963: Øivind Kaspersen
 1964–1969: Meyer Madsen 
 1970–1971: Rolf Fagermo
 1972-1972: Meyer Madsen
 1972–1975: Andreas Opsahl
 1976–1979: Håkon Willumsen 
 1980–1981: Harald Joakimsen 
 1982–1983: Svein Christensen 
 1984–1995: Roger Granberg (Ap)
 1995–1999: Jon Gisle Karlsen 
 1999-2003: Gunnar T. Skjellvik (Ap)
 2003-2011: Walter Pedersen (H)
 2011-2019: Petter Jørgen Pedersen (Ap)
 2019–present: Bjørn Magne Pedersen (H)

Buildings and structures

Sandhornøy Bridge connects the island of Sandhornøya to the mainland. The Kjellingstraumen Bridge crosses the outer end of the Beiar Fjord.

There is a VLF-transmitter in Gildeskål that is used for sending messages to submerged submarines (call sign: JXN, frequency: 16.4 kHz). It uses as antenna multiple wires spun between two mountains (photo).

Notable people 
 Elias Blix (1836–1902) a Norwegian professor, theologian, hymn writer and politician
 Harald Sund (1876–1940) a Norwegian architect, artist and illustrator
 Håvard Lund (born 1970) a Norwegian jazz musician (clarinet and saxophone) and composer

References

External links
Municipal fact sheet from Statistics Norway 

 
Municipalities of Nordland
Populated places of Arctic Norway
1838 establishments in Norway